Åsa Ekström is a Swedish comics artist, currently residing and working as a manga creator in Suginami, Tokyo, Japan.

Life and career

Born in the UNESCO World Heritage Site of Karlskrona, Blekinge in southern Sweden. Karlskrona is the site of Sweden's only naval base along with the Swedish Coast Guard.

Living in an area with a strong maritime tradition, the impact of the anime “Sailor Moon” introduced her to modern Japanese culture. 

After that, she read manga such as “Ranma ½” and “One Piece”. 
Åsa started to think about manga artists in Japan as she studied graphic design in Sweden.

On her seventh visit to Japan in 2011, she decided to settle there and started to post her 4-koma essay (her diary) manga on her blog.

In 2015 May, her manga,「北欧女子オーサがみつけた日本の不思議 (That's what Åsa found in Japan)」 was published by Media Factory.

In 2015 July, her romance genre trilogy of comics「さよならセプテンバー (Goodbye, September)」(3 volumes (complete), Japanese translated version) was published by CREEK & RIVER.

In 2015 October, the Traditional Chinese version of “That’s what Åsa found in Japan” published by Kadokawa in Taiwan by 台湾国際角川書店.

In 2015 December, her trilogy: “Goodbye, September” won the Gaiman Award .「ガイマン賞 2015 (Gaiman Award, foreign comics contest)」.

On 17 December 2015, NHK (Japan Broadcasting Corporation) interviewed her.

In 2016 February, the second volume of “That’s what Åsa found in Japan” was published by (台湾国際角川書店) Kadokawa in Taiwan.

References

External links
 asaekstrom.com

Living people
Manga artists
Women manga artists
Swedish cartoonists
Swedish women cartoonists
Swedish comics artists
Swedish female comics artists
Year of birth missing (living people)
Swedish expatriates in Japan
People from Karlskrona